Zone 75 is a zone of the municipality of Al Khor in the state of Qatar. The main districts recorded in the 2015 population census were Al Thakhira, Ras Laffan, and Umm Birka. 

Other districts which fall within its administrative boundaries are Al Waab, Umm Al Hawaya, Umm Al Qahab, Umm Ethnaitain, Wadi Al Harm, and Waab Al Mashrab.

Demographics

Land use
The Ministry of Municipality and Environment (MME) breaks down land use in the zone as follows.

References 

Zones of Qatar
Al Khor